Ulumanda is an Austronesian language of West Sulawesi, Indonesia. It is nearly intelligible with other Pitu Ulunna Salu languages.

References

Languages of Sulawesi
South Sulawesi languages